Saint Vincent and the Grenadines has competed at every edition of the IAAF World Athletics Championships. Its competing country code is VIN. The country has not won any medals at the competition and as of 2017 none of the country's athletes has reached the final of an event. Sprinters Kineke Alexander and Natasha Mayers have both competed in a World Championships semi-final.

References 

 
Saint Vincent and the Grenadines
World Championships in Athletics